is a Japanese regional bank that is based out of Morioka, the capital of Iwate prefecture in the Tohoku region of Japan.  It is one of the smallest regional banks in Japan.

History
The bank was created in November, 1950.

External links

 Tohoku Bank  
 Google Finance
 Hoovers Report

Regional banks of Japan
Companies based in Iwate Prefecture
Morioka, Iwate
Companies listed on the Tokyo Stock Exchange
Banks established in 1950
Japanese companies established in 1950